The Miroir d'eau (Water Mirror) in Bordeaux is the world's largest reflecting pool, covering . Located on the quay of the Garonne in front of the Place de la Bourse, it was built in 2006.

In the context of the quays embellishment operation (2000s), it was designed by landscape artist Michel Corajoud. Then it was built by the fountain-maker Jean-Max Llorca and the architect Pierre Gangnet, who reused a former underground warehouse to set the machinery and reservoir. 

The reflecting pool is made of granite slabs covered by 2 cm of water, and a system allows it to create mist every 15 minutes.

The Miroir d'eau works only from April to October, and it is the most-photographed site of the Port of the Moon.

Gallery

References 

Fountains in France
Buildings and structures in Bordeaux
Tourist attractions in Bordeaux